Martianthus is a genus of flowering plants belonging to the family Lamiaceae.

It is native to Peru and north-eastern Brazil.

The genus name of Martianthus is in honour of Carl Friedrich Philipp von Martius (1794–1868), a German botanist and explorer. 
It was first described and published in Phytotaxa Vol.58 on page 27 in 2012.

Known species
According to Kew:
Martianthus elongatus 
Martianthus leucocephalus 
Martianthus sancti-gabrielii 
Martianthus stachydifolius

References

Lamiaceae
Lamiaceae genera
Plants described in 2012
Flora of Peru
Flora of Brazil